Kyrönjoki is a river of Finland. It is located in Southern Ostrobothnia region and flows into the Gulf of Bothnia.

See also
 List of rivers of Finland

External links
 

Rivers of Finland
Drainage basins of the Baltic Sea
Rivers of Ilmajoki